Maplewood Farm may refer to:

Maplewood Farm (South Windham, Maine), listed on the National Register of Historic Places (NRHP)
Maplewood Farm (Spring Hill, Tennessee), also NRHP-listed